Phragmoteuthis is a genus of extinct coleoid cephalopod known from the late Triassic to the lower Jurassic. Its soft tissue has been preserved; some specimens contain intact ink sacs, and others, gills. It had an internal phragmocone and unknown numbers of arms.

Previously described species, P. conocauda and P. montefiorei got their own genus, Clarkeiteuthis.

References

Belemnoidea
Jurassic cephalopods
Triassic cephalopods
Mesozoic cephalopods of Europe
Prehistoric life of Europe
Late Triassic first appearances
Early Jurassic extinctions
Prehistoric cephalopod genera